Dear Dia is a Hindi remake of Kannada Film Dia directed and written by same director K.S. Ashoka starring Pruthvi Ambaar, Mihika Kushwaha, Ujjwal Sharma and Mrinal Kulkarni. Hindi version of Dia was produced by Kamlesh Singh Kushwaha. Dear Dia trailer was released on 10 May and film was released on 10 June 2022. Unlike the original, Hindi remake went unnoticed due to poor buzz and promotions.

Cast 
 Pruthvi Ambaar as Adi
 Mihika Kushwaha as Dia
 Ujjwal Sharma as Rohit
 Mrinal Kulkarni as Adi's mother
 Aahil Khan

References

External links 
 
 

Indian romance films
Hindi remakes of Kannada films
Films directed by K. S. Ashoka